The Women's K1 at the 2021 ICF Canoe Slalom World Championships took place on 23 and 25 September 2021 at the Čunovo Water Sports Centre in Bratislava. It was the 41st edition of the event, and 58 athletes from 29 nations competed.

Background
Eva Terčelj of Slovenia entered as the reigning world champion, having taken the title in 2019 in La Seu d'Urgell. Jess Fox was the World No. 1 and came into the championship having won the 2021 World Cup overall title and the last three World Cups. Ricarda Funk was the Olympic Champion from Tokyo and had the opportunity to become the first athlete to win the Olympics and World Championships in the same calendar year. World number 3 Corinna Kuhnle was also a favourite, as the winner of the 2019 World Cup round on this course and having become European Champion earlier this year.

3-time Olympic medallist Maialen Chourraut and World No. 5 Stefanie Horn were notable absentees from the field. Leading into the event, Jana Dukátová announced her retirement, ending a 25 year career that saw her become a three-time World Champion: 2006 in K1; 2010 in C1; and 2011 in K1 team.

Competition format
The women's K1 event in canoe slalom uses a three-round format with heats, a semifinal and final. Athletes complete up to two runs in the heats. In the first heat, the 20 fastest women qualify automatically for the semifinal, whilst the rest complete another run in the repêchage second heat for a further 10 qualification positions. The final rank of non-qualifying athletes is determined by their second run score. Athletes start in the reverse order of their heats position in the semifinal and complete a single run, with the top 10 advancing to the final. The athlete with the best time in the single-run final is awarded gold.

Penalties of 2 or 50 seconds are incurred for infractions such as missing a gate, touching a gate, or not negotiating gates in numerical order. A team may request up to one review of a penalty per boat in the heats or semifinals phases, with no enquiries considered in the finals.

Schedule
All times are Central European Summer Time (UTC+2)

Results
Tokyo Olympic bronze-medallist Jessica Fox topped the first heat with a clean 89.18 ahead of Olympic Champion Ricarda Funk. Camille Prigent won the second heat with the fourth-fastest time of the day. 2016 Olympic silver-medallist Luuka Jones finished 14th in the second heat, missing out on a spot in the semifinal. 

Despite 4 seconds of penalties, Funk topped the semifinal ahead of Corinna Kuhnle and Fiona Pennie. Fox initially set the fastest time but was awarded a 50 second penalty on downstream gate 12, placing 25th. Reigning Champion Eva Terčelj also received a 50 second penalty, finishing 26th.  This left Kuhnle as the only previous World Champion (2010 and 2011) in the final.

Funk won the 2021 K1W World Championship in a time of 94.80, including a 2 second penalty. Fellow countrywoman Elena Apel won silver, forming the first quinella in this event since Angelika Bahmann and Petra Krol finished 1-2 in 1977. Great Britain's Kimberley Woods won bronze, 3 days after winning the teams title and just a week after being involved in a car accident whilst preparing for the event. Funk's victory marked the first time any canoe slalom athlete became Olympic and World Champion in the same calendar year.

Penalties are included in the time shown. The fastest time in each round is shown in bold.

References

ICF Canoe Slalom World Championships
World Championships
ICF
International sports competitions hosted by Slovakia
Sport in Bratislava
Canoeing in Slovakia
ICF